The New Wave was a superhero team comic book published 1986-87 by Eclipse Comics. The team debuted in a preview included in the pages of two other Eclipse publications, The New DNAgents #9 and Miracleman #8, before debuting in its own book. For its initial eight issues, The New Wave was published bi-weekly as a 16-page book. Beginning with issue 9 through the end of the 13-issue run the book became a full-sized monthly.

Publication history
The series was co-created and written by Mindy Newell. The initial art team included penciller Lee Weeks and inker Ty Templeton. Issue #6 featured fill-in artist Erik Larsen, before he rose to fame on Marvel Comics' Spider-Man. Issue #13 was drawn by Eric Shanower.

The first five issues of the series depicted the team's origin, and is set on a space station owned by a corporation headed by a CEO with plans for world domination. During the course of the story, the extraterrestrial Tachyon is teleported onto the station, by scientist James Holmes, with whom Tachyon bonds. Dot, a spy with the power to shrink, sneaks aboard the station on a government mission. Circus acrobat Polestar stows away after a romantic interlude with a space shuttle pilot, while Avalon, Holmes' teenage witch daughter, and her boyfriend, the telekinetically powered Impulse, are brought there by the CEO to use as leverage against Holmes. Megabyte, one of the CEO's robot guards, switches sides and assists the others to foil the CEO's plot. After deciding to stay together as a team, issues 7 - 9 depicted the team traveling to the mystical realm of Avalon, during which the titular character's mother is revealed to be the Lady of the Lake of Arthurian legend. Subsequent single issues focused on The Volunteers, a group of superhumans with ties to Dot, Polestar's life in the circus, a "very special issue" about teen pregnancy, and Tachyon's sense of alienation.

Following the cancellation of the regular book, The New Wave returned in a two-issue "micro-series" called The New Wave versus The Volunteers. The book was rendered in 3-D in addition to non-3D format.

Following the bankruptcy of Eclipse Comics, its properties were purchased by Todd McFarlane, including the rights to the New Wave characters. The supporting character Heap has been re-imagined as an antagonist to McFarlane's character, Spawn.

Cast
 Avalon - teenage daughter of the legendary superhero "The Lady", Avalon is a powerful witch.
 Dot - a freelance spy with the power to shrink herself and, while small, fly and fire bio-electric blasts.
 Impulse - Avalon's neighbor, he is telekinetic.
 Megabyte - a robot programmed with the brain patterns of a physically disabled teenage boy.
 Polestar - a circus acrobat, she carries a telescoping pole for hand-to-hand combat.
 Tachyon - blue-skinned, blue-haired extra-dimensional being with superhuman strength and the power of flight.

Supporting cast included James Holmes, Avalon's father and a scientist who was partially responsible for bringing Tachyon from his home dimension, and The Heap, a Golden Age character similar to Marvel's Man-Thing.

Influence
Writer Jay Faerber, who first discovered The New Wave after he began frequenting a comic book store called Gema Books as a high school freshman, has cited the book as a seminal influence on him and his writing, citing its experimental biweekly, 16-page format, its emphasis on character depth over physical combat, and the originality of the character's personalities and motivations.

References

Eclipse Comics superheroes
Eclipse Comics titles
Superhero teams